Howard Joseph Hancock (December 20, 1894 – February 12, 1978) was an American football and baseball coach and college athletics administrator. He served as the head football coach at Oshkosh State Normal School—now known as the University of Wisconsin–Oshkosh from 1921 to 1928 and again in 1930 and at Illinois State Normal University—now known as Illinois State University—in Normal, Illinois, from 1931 until 1944, and compiling a career college football coaching record of 95–65–29. Hancock was the head baseball coach at Illinois State from 1933 to 1946, tallying a mark of 120–112–2, and also coached golf at the school. He was the athletic director at Oshkosh State from 1921 to 1931 and Illinois State from 1931 to 1961. Hancock Stadium, the home venue for the Illinois State Redbirds football team is named for him.

Hancock was born on December 20, 1894, in Shullsburg, Wisconsin.  He was captain of the football team at the University of Wisconsin–Madison before graduating in 1918. Hancock died on February 12, 1978, while visiting his wife at the Octavia Manor Nursing Home in Colfax, Illinois.

Including his records from other schools, Hancock leads college football with the highest tie percentage in varsity play.

Head coaching record

Football

References

External links
 

1894 births
1978 deaths
Illinois State Redbirds athletic directors
Illinois State Redbirds baseball coaches
Illinois State Redbirds football coaches
Wisconsin Badgers football players
Wisconsin–Oshkosh Titans athletic directors
Wisconsin–Oshkosh Titans football coaches
College golf coaches in the United States
People from Shullsburg, Wisconsin
Coaches of American football from Wisconsin
Players of American football from Wisconsin
Baseball coaches from Wisconsin
Baseball players from Wisconsin